Apple Store can refer to several retail operations of Apple Inc.:
 Apple Store or Apple Retail Store, a chain of physical stores that mainly sells Apple hardware products or provide support services
 Apple Online Store, an online version of the Apple Retail Store at Apple.com
 App Store (iOS/iPadOS), an online store for iOS, iPadOS, tvOS, watchOS, and iMessage applications
 Mac App Store, an online store for macOS applications

Other
 iTunes Store, an online media store that sells music, movies, and TV shows
Apple Books Store, an online bookstore that sells eBooks and audiobooks

See also
 Apple Specialist
 Computerware
 Haddock Corporation
 Nabih's Inc.
 Small Dog Electronics
 Tekserve
 App store

Apple Inc. services